Visavadar is one of the 182 Legislative Assembly constituencies of Gujarat state in India. It is part of Junagadh district and a segment of Junagadh Lok Sabha constituency.

List of segments
This assembly seat represents the following segments,

 Visavadar Taluka
 Bhesan Taluka
 Junagadh Taluka (Part) Villages – Kerala, Bhiyal, Choki, Kathrota, Isapur, Baliyavad, Chokli, Vadal, Sukhpur, Bamangam, Dervan, Hasnapur, Jambudi, Indreshvar, Surajkund, Girnar Hills, Dungar Thana, Bordevi, Limbdi Dhar, Mandlikpur, Nava Pipaliya, Bandhala, Bhalgam, Mandanpara, Ramnath, Dungarpur, Vijapur, Sodvadar, Intala, Patapur, Salatha, Khadiya, Toraniya, Navagam, Bilkha, Umrala, Avatadiya Mota, Chorvadi, Anandpur, Mevasa Khadiya, Bagdu, Prabhatpur, Rameshvar, Avatadiya Nana, Mevasa Kamribaina, Bela, Badalpur, Jamka, Semrala, Sankhdavadar, Thumbala.
 Bagasara Taluka (Part) of Amreli District Village – Kadaya

Members of Vidhan Sabha
1972 - Ramjibhai D Karkar (Congress)  
1975 - 
1980 - 
1995 - Keshubhai Patel, Bharatiya Janata Party
1998 - Keshubhai Patel, Bharatiya Janata Party
2002 - Kanu Bhalala, Bharatiya Janata Party
2007 - Kanu Bhalala, Bharatiya Janata Party
2012 - Keshubhai Patel, Gujarat Parivartan Party  (Resigned due to ill-health) 
2014 ^ - Harshad Ribadiya, Indian National Congress (By-poll)

Election results

2022

2017

2014 by-poll

2012

2007

2002

1995

See also
 List of constituencies of Gujarat Legislative Assembly
 Gujarat Legislative Assembly

References

External links
 

Assembly constituencies of Gujarat
Junagadh district
Year of establishment missing